The 2011 Idaho Vandals football team represented the University of Idaho as a member of the Western Athletic Conference (WAC) in the 2011 NCAA Division I FBS football season. The Vandals were led by fifth-year head coach Robb Akey and played their home games at the Kibbie Dome. They finished the season 2–10 overall and 1–6 in WAC play to place last out of eight teams.

Schedule

NFL Draft
One Vandal was selected in the 2012 NFL Draft:

 List of Idaho Vandals in the NFL Draft

References

Idaho
Idaho Vandals football seasons
Idaho Vandals football